Gheghiya (also spelled Gheghia) is a village in Mohania block of Kaimur district, Bihar, India. As of 2011, its population was 1,557, in 238 households.

References 

Villages in Kaimur district